Adel Amar Belkacem Bouzida (born 28 February 2002) is an Algerian footballer who currently plays as a forward for Paradou.

Club career
In October 2019, he was included in The Guardian's "Next Generation 2019", highlighting the best young players worldwide.

International career
Belkacem Bouzida was called up to the Algeria national under-17 football team in 2018. This was followed up with a call up to the under-20 side in 2020.

Career statistics

Club

Notes

References

External links
 

2002 births
Living people
Algerian footballers
Algeria youth international footballers
Association football forwards
Algerian Ligue Professionnelle 1 players
Paradou AC players